The 2015 Rugby Europe Women's Sevens – Division A was the second level of international women's rugby sevens competitions organised by Rugby Europe for 2015. The competition featured just one tournament, played at the Darius and Girėnas Stadium. Belgium won the tournament, and along with runner-up Finland, were promoted to the 2016 Grand Prix series. Georgia and Lithuania were relegated to the 2016 Conferences.

Tournament

Pool stage

Pool A

Pool B

Pool C

Knockout stage

Bowl

Plate

Cup

Division A standings

References

Rugby Europe Women's Sevens Trophy
A
Europe
Rugby